Lawrence Raymond "Larry" Leach (June 18, 1936 – May 8, 2018) was a Canadian ice hockey centre. He played three seasons for the Boston Bruins between 1958 and 1962. He played a sporadic third and fourth line centre role while in Boston. The rest of his career, which lasted from 1956 to 1973, was spent in the minor leagues.

Career statistics

Regular season and playoffs

References

External links
 

1936 births
2018 deaths
Boston Bruins players
Canadian ice hockey centres
Ice hockey people from Alberta
Sportspeople from Lloydminster
Portland Buckaroos players
Providence Reds players
Springfield Indians players
Vancouver Canucks (WHL) players
Victoria Cougars (1949–1961) players